Moses Dramwi Mawa (born 4 August 1996) is a Norwegian football striker for Kristiansund.

Career
He played youth football for Oppsal and Holmlia before starting his senior career in Lyn. For the dormant former first-tier team he scored 6 goals in the 2015 2. divisjon. Lyn were relegated, and Mawa continued for two seasons in Bærum SK and one season in KFUM, who won promotion to the 2019 1. divisjon. Making his mark here with 10 goals in 15 matches, he was bought by Strømsgodset during the summer transfer window, and even scored on his debut against Bodø/Glimt. In August 2021, he moved to Kristiansund on a contract until the end of the 2024 season.

Career statistics

Club

References

External links

1996 births
Living people
Footballers from Oslo
Norwegian footballers
Holmlia SK players
Lyn Fotball players
Bærum SK players
KFUM-Kameratene Oslo players
Strømsgodset Toppfotball players
Kristiansund BK players
Norwegian Second Division players
Norwegian First Division players
Eliteserien players
Association football forwards